Bushnell Township may refer to the following places in the United States:

 Bushnell Township, McDonough County, Illinois
 Bushnell Township, Michigan